Swimming was contested at the 1986 Asian Games in Jamsil Indoor Swimming Pool, Seoul, South Korea from 21 September to 26 September 1986.

Medalists

Men

Women

Medal table

References 

 New Straits Times, September 24–29, 1986
 Sports 123: Asian Games

External links 
 Olympic Council of Asia

 
1986 Asian Games events
1986
Asian Games
1986 Asian Games
International aquatics competitions hosted by South Korea